Vladislav Yasyukevich (born 30 May 1994) is a Belarusian professional footballer who plays for Molodechno.

References

External links
 
 

1994 births
Living people
Belarusian footballers
Association football defenders
FC Isloch Minsk Raion players
FC Rukh Brest players
FC Belshina Bobruisk players
FC Dynamo Brest players
FC Molodechno players